Iganmode Grammar School is a secondary school in Ota, Ogun State, Nigeria that was established in 1960. Its Principal is Mr. Olalekan Akinosi.

Cowbell National Secondary School Mathematics Competition
Igamode Grammar School has lived up to the dictates of its well crafted anthem by winning the coveted Cowbell National Secondary School Mathematics Competition (NASSMAC) for three consecutive seasons in 2011, 2012 and 2013. Though, a public school, students of Iganmode Grammar School, fondly called IGS by its alumnus have defended the coveted Promasidor NASSMAC mathematics prize back-to-back thereby gathering accolades for the school. For the very first time in the history of Cowbell National Mathematics competition in Nigeria Public Schools, students of Iganmode Grammar School (SNR) Ota won the overall best prize for three consecutive years, 2011, 2012 and 2013

Notable alumni
 Olalekan Olude, entrepreneur, the co-founder and COO of Jobberman

References

Secondary schools in Nigeria
Schools in Ogun State
Educational institutions established in 1960
1960 establishments in Nigeria